Yeltsovka is a rural locality (a selo) and the administrative center of Khayryuzovsky Selsoviet, Troitsky District, Altai Krai, Russia. The population was 646 as of 2013. There are 4 streets.

Geography 
It is located 110 km south-east from Barnaul, on the Yeltsovka River.

References 

Rural localities in Troitsky District, Altai Krai